Baron Wormser (born 1948, in Baltimore, Maryland) is an American poet.

Biography 
Baron Wormser was born in Baltimore on February 15, 1948. He earned his BA from Johns Hopkins University, later doing graduate studies at the University of California-Irvine and University of Maine. Wormser served as librarian for 25 years in Madison, Maine.

Wormser served as Poet Laureate of Maine from 2000 to 2006. In 2000, he was writer in residence at the University of South Dakota. Since 2002, he has taught in the Stonecoast MFA program at the University of Maine-Farmington, and since 2009, Fairfield University.

He founded the Frost Place Conference on Poetry and Teaching at The Frost Place in Franconia, New Hampshire and is currently director of educational outreach at the Frost Place.

Wormser's poems have been read by Garrison Keillor on The Writer's Almanac.

Personal 
Wormser has lived in Cabot and currently lives in Montpelier, Vermont with his wife, Janet.

Awards
 Frederick Bock Prize from Poetry 
 Kathryn A. Morton Prize 
 Bread Loaf fellowship
 National Endowment for the Arts fellowship
 1998 Guggenheim Fellowship

Works
Songs From a Voice: Being the Recollections, Stanzas, and Observations of Abe Runyan, Song Writer and Performer, Woodhall Press, 2021
Impenitent Notes, CavanKerry Press, 2011
Scattered Chapters: New and Selected Poems, Sarabande Books, 2008
Carthage Illuminated Sea Press, 2005
Subject Matter Sarabande Books, 2004
Mulroney and Others Sarabande Books, 2000
When Sarabande Books, 1997
Atoms, Soul Music and Other Poems Paris Review Editions, 1989
Good Trembling, Houghton Mifflin, 1985
The White Words Houghton Mifflin, 1983

Prose
Teach Us That Peace, Piscataqua Press, 2013
The Poetry Life: Ten Stories CavanKerry Press, 2008
The Road Washes Out in Spring: A Poet's Memoir of Living Off the Grid UPNE, 2006
A Surge of Language: Teaching Poetry Day by Day, co-author David Cappella, Heinemann, 2004
Teaching the Art of Poetry: The Moves, co-author David Cappella, Lawrence Erlbaum Associates, 2000

External links 
 Author's website
 Poets.org bio

References

American male poets
1948 births
Living people
Fairfield University faculty
20th-century American poets
20th-century American male writers
Poets Laureate of Maine